The Gallery Climate Coalition was established in 2020 to address the carbon footprint of the international art market. While non-profit organizations including the Tate have addressed climate change and art's impact thereon, this is thought to be the first action taken by the commercial art world.

Founding parties include: Thomas Dane, Kate MacGarry, Lisson Gallery's Sadie Coles and Greg Hilty, Frieze Art Fair co-founder Matthew Slotover and director Victoria Siddall.

References

External links
galleryclimatecoalition.org

Organizations established in 2020
Climate change artists